Gnokii is a suite of programs for communicating with mobile phones.  It was initially only available for Nokia mobile phones, but later extended to support others. It is available for Linux, BSD unix, Windows, and Mac OS X, and as source code.

Gnokii itself is a console tool, but it is used by several GUIs to communicate with phones; for example: Xgnokii, Gnocky, and Gnome Phone Manager all use Gnokii internally.

It is licensed using the GNU GPL.

Features
 Use to Activate Nokia network monitor
 Supports sending SMS (with delivery report), picture messages, can send/receive ring tones (as SMS)
 Phonebook
 Dial/Receive calls
 Calendar

Connect could be established using serial/USB cables, infrared, Bluetooth.

See also 

 OpenSync – Open Source synchronization framework
 Gammu (software) –  a program for communicating with mobile phones
 BitPim – Open Source CDMA management and synchronization software

References

External links 
 

Mobile device management software
Utilities for macOS
Utilities for Windows
Utilities for Linux